The Hispaniola worm snake (Typhlops pusillus) is a species of snake in the Typhlopidae family.

References

Typhlops
Reptiles described in 1914
Reptiles of the Dominican Republic
Reptiles of Haiti
Endemic fauna of Hispaniola